Jacurso is a village and comune in the province of Catanzaro in the Calabria region of southern Italy.

The village is renowned for its production of homemade ice cream.

Notes and references

Cities and towns in Calabria